Oolanpara is a suburb in the city of Thiruvananthapuram and is situated between Peroorkada and Sasthamangalam. The Government Mental Health Center is located here.

Etymology
Oolanpara, as the name implies, used to be famous for its numerous wolves. Local legend is that the wolves used to assemble in the middle of the night near a hill. The authenticity of the hill is questionable because there are no indications of a hilly topography in the area. Nevertheless, a boulder may have existed at the place and the gregarian behaviour of wolves is widely accepted. The present place is famous for the Govt Mental Health centre whose fame extends even to the southern districts of Tamil Nadu, a neighboring state of Kerala.

References

Suburbs of Thiruvananthapuram